Brunei sent a Lawn Bowls team to the 2006 Commonwealth Games in Melbourne.

Medals

Gold

Silver

Bronze

Nations at the 2006 Commonwealth Games
Brunei at the Commonwealth Games
Comm